The Eparchy of Bačka is an ecclesiastical territory or eparchy of the Serbian Orthodox Church in the Bačka region, Serbia. It is situated in the autonomous province of Vojvodina and the seat of the eparchy is at Saint George's Cathedral in Novi Sad.

History

The eparchy was established in the 16th century. In the beginning, the seat of the bishop was in Segedin (today in Hungary). It was later moved to monasteries of Bačka, and was finally stabilized in Novi Sad in the beginning of the 18th century.

Seems that between the second half of the 16th century and the second half of the 17th century, the Eparchy was a Metropolitanate, since its administrators in this time period are mentioned with metropolitan title.

Territory

The eparchy includes entire Serbian part of Bačka, but also has supreme authority over some territories in present-day Hungary, including counties Bács-Kiskun (Baja), Csongrád (Szeged) and Heves (Eger).

Bishops and metropolitans
Filip, bishop
Sava, bishop
Makarije, bishop
Simeon, bishop
Georgije, metropolitan (1579)
Mardarije, metropolitan (1609)
Mihailo, metropolitan (1651)
Georgije, bishop (1667)
Jeftimije Drobnjak, bishop (1695-1708)
Stevan Metohijac, bishop (1708-1709)
Hristofor Dimitrijević-Mitrović, bishop (1710-1712)
Grigorije Dimitrijević, bishop (1713-1717)
Sofronije Tomašević, bishop (1718-1730)
Visarion Pavlović, bishop (1731-1756)
Mojsije Putnik, bishop (1757-1774)
Arsenije Radivojević, bishop (1774-1781)
Atanasije Živković, bishop (1781-1782)
Josif Jovanović Šakabenta, bishop (1783-1786)
Jovan Jovanović, bishop (1786-1805)
Gedeon Petrović, bishop (1807-1832)
Stefan Stanković, bishop (1834-1837)
Georgije Hranislav, bishop (1839-1843)
Platon Atanacković, bishop (1851-1867)
German Anđelić, bishop (1874-1882)
Vasilijan Petrović, bishop (1885-1891)
German Opačić, bishop (1893-1899)
Mitrofan Šević, bishop (1900-1918)
Dr. Irinej Ćirić, bishop (1922-1955)
Nikanor Iličić, bishop (1955-1986)
Dr. Irinej Bulović, bishop (1990-current)

Monasteries belonging to the eparchy
Kovilj Monastery in Novi Sad municipality. The monastery was reconstructed in 1705-1707. According to the legend, the monastery of Kovilj was founded by the first Serb archbishop Saint Sava in the 13th century.
Bođani Monastery in Bač municipality. It was founded in 1478.
Sombor Monastery in Sombor municipality. It was founded in 1928-1933.
In the outset of the 18th century there was a Serb monastery in Bački Monoštor near Sombor.

See also
Eastern Orthodoxy in Serbia
List of eparchies of the Serbian Orthodox Church
Religion in Serbia
Religion in Vojvodina

Sources
Narodna enciklopedija, article written by Radoslav Grujić.

External links

 

16th-century establishments in Serbia
Bačka
Dioceses established in the 16th century
Religious sees of the Serbian Orthodox Church
Serbian Orthodox Church in Serbia
Serbian Orthodox Church in Vojvodina